Cybaeina is a genus of North American araneomorph spiders in the family Cybaeidae, and was first described by R. V. Chamberlin & Wilton Ivie in 1932. Originally described from a single female found in Olympia, Washington, it was placed with the Cybaeidae in 1967.

Species
 it contains four species, all found in the United States:
Cybaeina confusa Chamberlin & Ivie, 1942 – USA
Cybaeina minuta (Banks, 1906) (type) – USA
Cybaeina sequoia Roth, 1952 – USA
Cybaeina xantha Chamberlin & Ivie, 1937 – USA

References

Araneomorphae genera
Cybaeidae
Spiders of the United States